Harney Lake is a shallow alkali lake basin located in southeast Oregon, United States, approximately  south of the city of Burns. The lake lies within the boundary of the Malheur National Wildlife Refuge and is the lowest point in the Blitzen Valley drainage.

History 
The lake has been known by several names, including Salt Lake in 1838, Tonowama, and Lake Harney.

Despite a history of 9,000 years of human inhabitation on Harney Lake by the Northern Paiute Indians primarily as nomadic wintering camps, little sign of modern human habitation is evident on Harney Lake.  The nearest residents live in the community of Narrows.

Water level 
The depth of Harney Lake is less than  during normal water years and has dried up completely during times of drought.

As typical to other alkali lake beds in the western United States, minimal aquatic life is found in Harney Lake. A species of inland brine shrimp is the only form of life in Harney Lake. Despite its limited food supply, the lake is part of an important inland marsh ecosystem for migratory birds in the arid southeast Oregon desert.

Ecology

Malheur Lake Basin redband trout
Malheur and Harney lakes have reduced access by Great Basin redband trout due to irrigation diversions, channelization, draining of marshlands and high alkalinities. Even if trout could gain access again, redband populations would not survive in this marginal habitat. Harney Lake has been inhospitable to redband trout for many years due to high alkalinities. Today, redband trout in the Malheur Lakes Basin are widely distributed in small- and medium-size streams.

The redband is a unique subspecies adapted to the Malheur Lake Basin ecosystem. In these closed High Desert basins, redband trout have evolved to survive in environments with vast extremes of both water flow and temperature.  They are one of only eight separate desert basin populations of interior native redband trout. The Malheur Lakes redband comprises 10 population groups in the closed interior basin of Harney and Malheur lakes. Historically, all streams were interconnected and these fish moved to the lakes and among population segments.

While not an officially designated threatened or endangered species, the Redband Trout is recognized as important resource, and this law sets aside land in Oregon for protection and research of Redband Trout.  The Steens Mountains Cooperative Management and Protection Act of 2000 (Public Law 106-399)

See also
 List of lakes in Oregon

References

External links 
U.S. Fish and Wildlife Service: Malheur National Wildlife Refuge
Malheur National Wildlife Refuge Comprehensive Conservation Plan
Getting, A.C. (1992) Lake and Marsh-Edge Settlements on Malheur Lake, Harney County, Oregon. Journal of California and Great Basin Anthropology. 14(1): 110-129.
O'Grady, P.W. (2006) Before Winter Comes: Archaeological Investigations of Settlement and Subsistence in Harney Valley, Harney County, Oregon. unpublished PhD dissertation, Department of Anthropology. University of Oregon, Eugene, Oregon. 541 pp.
Templeton, A. (2015) Oregon Archaeologists Discover 15,000-Year-Old Knife. (west of Burns, Oregon) Oregon Public Radio, March 5, 2015. Retrieved January 12, 2016.
Vickstrom, D., and L.A. Sirrine (2001) Harney-Maiheur Lakes Sub-Basin Assessment. Harney County Watershed Council. Burns, Oregon.

 Photo of merging lakes spilling over Frenchglen Highway

Lakes of Oregon
Lakes of Harney County, Oregon
Malheur National Wildlife Refuge
Endorheic lakes of Oregon